Antiplanes briseis is a species of sea snail, a marine gastropod mollusk in the family Pseudomelatomidae.

Description
The length of the shell attains , its diameter .

(Original description) The elongate, acute, white shell is covered with a very pale olivaceous periostracum. It shows a blunt swollen protoconch of about a 1½ whorl (eroded) and eight subsequent rather flattish whorls. The suture is obscure and appressed. The spiral sculpture consists of one or two feeble flattish cords between the periphery and the succeeding suture on the spire, and on the body whorl about twice as many more or less obsolete. The axial sculpture consists of rather prominent, deeply arcuate incremental lines. The anal fasciole is wide and not impressed. The deepest part of the sulcusis  near the periphery. The aperture is narrow. The outer lip is thin, sharp and much produced. The inner lip and the columella are erased, the latter short, straight, obliquely attenuated in front. The siphonal canal is distinct, produced and straight.

Distribution
The holotype was found off Drakes Bay, California, USA.

References

External links
 

briseis
Gastropods described in 1919